The men's welterweight event was part of the boxing programme at the 1992 Summer Olympics. The weight class allowed boxers of up to 67 kilograms to compete. The competition was held from 26 July to 8 August 1992. 30 boxers from 30 nations competed.

Medalists

Results
The following boxers took part in the event:

First round
 Michael Carruth (IRL) – BYE
 Maselino Tuifao (SAM) – BYE
 Andreas Otto (GER) def. Andrew Luis (GUY), 8:7
 Mario Romero (NIC) def. Khyber Shah (PAK), 7:2
 Pepe Reilly (USA) def. Victor Manuel Baute (ESP), RSC-3
 Vitalijus Karpačiauskas (LTU) def. Andrey Pestryayev (EUN), 9:4
 Arkhom Chenglai (THA) def. Yousef Khateri (IRN), 13:7
 Nicodemus Odore (KEN) def. José Guzman (VEN), RSCH-2
 Aníbal Santiago Acevedo (PUR) def. Harry Simon (NAM), 13:11
 Stefen Scriggins (AUS) def. Francisco Moniz (ANG), 6:2
 Adrian Dodson (GBR) def. Masashi Kawakami (JPN), RSC-3
 Francisc Vaştag (ROM) def. Tajudeen Sabitu (NGR), 9:0
 Sören Antman (SWE) def. Giovanni Pretorius (SAF), RSC-1
 César Augusto Ramoz (DOM) def. Wieslaw Malyszko (POL), 6:1
 Jun Jin-Chul (KOR) def. Abdellah Touane (MAR), 5:1
 Juan Hernández Sierra (CUB) def. Said Bennajem (FRA), 6:0

Second round
 Michael Carruth (IRL) def. Maselino Tuifao (SAM), 11:2
 Andreas Otto (GER) def. Mario Romero (NIC), RSCH-2
 Vitalijus Karpačiauskas (LTU) def. Pepe Reilly (USA), 16:5
 Arkhom Chenglai (THA) def. Nicodemus Odore (KEN), 13:10
 Aníbal Santiago Acevedo (PUR) def. Stefen Scriggins (AUS), 16:3
 Francisc Vaştag (ROM) def. Adrian Dodson (GBR), 6:5
 Sören Antman (SWE) def. César Augusto Ramoz (DOM), RSC-2
 Juan Hernández Sierra (CUB) def. Jun Jin-Chul (KOR), RSC-2

Quarterfinals
 Michael Carruth (IRL) def. Andreas Otto (GER), 35:22
 Arkhom Chenglai (THA) def. Vitalijus Karpačiauskas (LTU), 9:6
 Aníbal Santiago Acevedo (PUR) def. Francisc Vaştag (ROM), 20:9
 Juan Hernández Sierra (CUB) dev. Sören Antman (SWE), RSCH-2

Semifinals
 Michael Carruth (IRL) def. Arkhom Chenglai (THA), 11:4
 Juan Hernández Sierra (CUB) def. Aníbal Santiago Acevedo (PUR), 11:2

Final
 Michael Carruth (IRL) def. Juan Hernández Sierra (CUB), 13:10

References

Welterweight